Red Wing is a city in Goodhue County, Minnesota, United States, along the upper Mississippi River. The population was 16,547 at the 2020 census. It is the county seat of Goodhue County.

This city is named for early 19th-century Dakota Sioux chief Red Wing. The federal government established a Mdewakanton Sioux Indian reservation—now Prairie Island Indian Community—in 1889 along the Mississippi River to free up land for new settlers. The city of Red Wing developed around it.

The National Trust for Historic Preservation placed Red Wing on its 2008 distinctive destinations list because of its "impressive architecture and enviable natural environment."

History

In the early 1850s, settlers from Mississippi River steamboats came to Red Wing to farm in Goodhue County. They encroached on traditional territory of the Mdewakanton Sioux.

The settlers cleared the land for wheat, the annual crop of which could pay the cost of the land. Before railroads were constructed across the territory of Goodhue County, it produced more wheat than any other county in the country. In 1873, Red Wing led the country in wheat sold by farmers. The warehouses in the port of Red Wing could store and export more than a million bushels.

Once the railroads connected southern Minnesota with Minneapolis and Saint Anthony, where the largest flour mills were built, the port at Red Wing lost prominence.

The Aurora Ski Club in Red Wing, founded on February 8, 1887, was one of the first ski clubs in North America, reflecting the skills of Scandinavian immigrants in the area. In the 1880s, Aurora club members introduced what became known as "Red Wing Style" ski techniques, patterned after the Telemark skiing form. The term "Red Wing style" remained in use in the U.S. well into the 20th century. In 1887, Norwegian immigrant Mikkjel Hemmestveit set the first North American ski jumping record, 37 feet, at the Aurora Ski Club's McSorley Hill.

In 1889, the federal government established a Mdewakanton Sioux Indian reservation along the Mississippi River to free up land for settlers. It is now within the city of Red Wing, and is known as the Prairie Island Indian Community.

Red Wing's first settlers built small mills, factories, and workshops like those they were familiar with in New England and the upper Midwest, whence many had come. Numerous immigrants from Germany, Ireland, Norway and Sweden settled in this area and were also skilled craftsmen. Some early industries were tanning and shoe-making, while other businesses manufactured farm equipment, bricks, barrels, boats, furniture, pottery, and clothing buttons. Consumables included beer and lumber. Service industries including stone-cutting, hospitality, and retailing. The St. James Hotel remains a working token of the earlier time.

Red Wing was once home to Hamline University, founded in 1854 as Minnesota's first institution of higher education. It closed in 1869 because of low enrollment due to diversion of students to the American Civil War. Chartered in St. Paul in 1871, it reopened there in 1880.

Red Wing Seminary was a Lutheran Church seminary, founded in 1879. It was the educational center for Hauge's Norwegian Evangelical Lutheran Synod in America, commonly known as the Hauge Synod. Red Wing Seminary operated until 1917.

Red Wing also was the home of Minnesota Elementarskola, a Swedish elementary school that was the predecessor to Gustavus Adolphus College, a private liberal arts college of the Evangelical Lutheran Church of America (ELCA). The school was founded in Red Wing in 1862 by Eric Norelius, moved to East Union in 1863, and then was built in St. Peter in 1873–76.

The Red Wing Pottery and stoneware industry began in 1861, when county potter John Paul discovered the large, glacially deposited clay pit beds in the northwest of the city, close to Hay Creek. The first commercial pottery company, Red Wing Stoneware, was founded in 1877. It used clay from the area of the Hay Creek headwaters, close to Goodhue, near a hamlet named Claybank. A railroad branch line was built to carry clay to Red Wing for this industry. The factory buildings remain, but only traces of the railroad, abandoned in 1937, are left.

20th century to present

The Minnesota Correctional Facility – Red Wing is housed in the former Minnesota State Training School, built in 1889. Warren B. Dunnell designed the original Romanesque building. He was the architect of a number of Minnesota's public buildings. The institution was the subject of "Walls of Red Wing", a folk song by American singer-songwriter Bob Dylan.

In the last half of the 20th century, the United States Army Corps of Engineers built Lock and Dam No. 3 and deepened the channel on the Mississippi River to improve navigation in this area. Such projects have revitalized Mississippi River traffic for shipping grain and coal. The port of Red Wing has gained business as a result.

In 1973, the Prairie Island Nuclear Power Plant opened along the river. The federal government authorized the project in consultation with the Minnesota state government. Xcel Energy owns and operates the facility.

Geography
The city is at the northern edge of the Driftless Area of karst topography.

Neighborhoods
Red Wing has several neighborhoods or other places annexed by the city. These include:
 Burnside Township
 East Red Wing
 Eggleston

Demographics

2010
As of the 2010 Census, there were 16,459 people, 7,017 households, and 4,328 families residing in the city. The racial makeup of the city was 91.5% White, 1.9% African American, 2.2% Native American, 0.8% Asian, 1.2% from other races, and 2.3% from two or more races. Hispanic or Latino of any race were 3.7% of the population.

There were 7,017 households, of which 28.0% had children under the age of 18 living with them, 46.6% were married couples living together, 10.6% had a female householder with no husband present, 4.5% had a male householder with no wife present, and 38.3% were non-families. 32.2% of all households were made up of individuals, and 14.6% had someone living alone who was 65 years of age or older. The average household size was 2.27 and the average family size was 2.84.

The median age in the city was 41.8 years. 22.5% of residents were under the age of 18; 7.8% were between the ages of 18 and 24; 23.9% were from 25 to 44; 27.7% were from 45 to 64; and 18.2% were 65 years of age or older. The gender makeup of the city was 48.6% male and 51.4% female.

2000
At the 2000 Census, there were 16,116 people, 6,562 households, and 4,166 families in the city. The population density was 455.3 per square mile (175.8 km2). The ethnical makeup was 94.33% White, 1.32% African American, 2.22% Native American, 0.74% Asian, 0.05% Pacific Islander, 0.53% from other ethnicities, and 0.82% from two or more ethnicities. Hispanic or Latino of any ethnicity were 1.27% of the population.

There were 6,562 households, of which 30.4% had children under 18 with them, 51.2% were married couples living together, 8.9% had a female householder with no husband present, and 36.5% were non-families. 30.7% of all households were of individuals and 13.3% had someone living alone 65 or older. The average household size was 2.35 and the average family 2.94.

In the city, the population was 24.6% under 18, 8.2% from 18 to 24, 27.5% from 25 to 44, 23.2% from 45 to 64, and 16.5% 65 or older. The median was 39. For every 100 females, there were 93.5 males. For every 100 females 18 and over, there were 90.6 males.

The median income for a household was $43,674, and the median for a family was $54,641. Males had a median of $36,576 versus $25,477 for females. The per capita income was $21,678. About 3.9% of families and 6.8% of the population were below the poverty line, including 7.9% of those under age 18 and 8.0% of those 65 or over.

Economy
Manufacturers in Red Wing include Red Wing Shoes, Riedell Skates, and Red Wing Stoneware.

Arts and culture

Festivals
 Big Turn Music Fest - February
 Prairie Island Indian Community Wacipi (Pow Wow) - July
 Rolling River Music Festival – July
 River City Days – 1st weekend in August
 Hispanic Heritage Festival – 2nd weekend in September
 MN Children's Book Festival - 3rd weekend in September
 Fall Festival of the Arts – 2nd weekend in October    
 Holiday Stroll - Friday after Thanksgiving

Library
Red Wing Public Library is a member of Southeastern Libraries Cooperating.

Parks and recreation
The Cannon Valley Trail's eastern terminus is in Red Wing. The nearby Prairie Island Indian Reservation operates Treasure Island Resort and Casino.

Government

The mayor is Mike Wilson. His term ends in January 2025.

Media

Radio
KCUE, an AM classic country station, and KWNG, an FM classic hits station, are both licensed to Red Wing.

Infrastructure

Transportation
Red Wing is connected to Wisconsin by Red Wing Bridge (officially named the Eisenhower Bridge); it carries U.S. Route 63 over the Mississippi River and its backwaters. U.S. Routes 61 and 63 and Minnesota State Highways 19 and 58 are the main intercity highways. Minnesota State Highway 292 is also in the city.

Red Wing Regional Airport is across the Mississippi River in Pierce County, Wisconsin, near Wisconsin Highway 35 .

Red Wing's Amtrak station is served by Amtrak's  daily in each direction between Chicago to the east, and Seattle and Portland on the west.

Notable people

 Eugenie Anderson (1909–1997), U.S. ambassador to Denmark and Bulgaria
 Tams Bixby (1855–1922), born in Red Wing, member of U.S. Dawes Commission
 Ryan Boldt (born 1994), baseball player
 Joseph Francis Busch (1866–1953), Roman Catholic bishop
 William C. Christianson (1892–1985), Minnesota Supreme Court justice
 William J. Colvill, (1830–1905), Civil War hero and Minnesota attorney general
 Frances Densmore (1867–1957), ethnographer and ethnomusicologist
 Orin Densmore (1805-1872), Minnesota state representative and businessman
 Philip S. Duff (1922-19997), Minnesota state senator and newspaper editor
 Joanell Dyrstad (born 1942), Minnesota lieutenant governor (1991–1995)
 Patrick Flueger (born 1983), actor
 Mikkjel Hemmestveit (1863–1957), skiing champion
 Torjus Hemmestveit (1860–1930), skiing champion
 Stanley E. Hubbard (1897–1992), founder of Hubbard Broadcasting
 Philander P. Humphrey (1823–1862), physician, politician
 Richard R. Lemke (1930-2016), Minnesota state legislator and farmer
 Ned Locke (1919–1992), television personality, Bozo's Circus
 Martin Maginnis (1841–1919), politician, Union Army veteran
 Lyle Mehrkens (1937–2018), Minnesota state legislator and farmer
 Greg Norton (born 1959), bassist for Hüsker Dü and restaurateur
 Henrietta Barclay Paist (1870–1930), artist, designer, teacher, and author
 Robert Ezra Park (1864–1944), urban sociologist
 Mitchell Peters (1935–2017), percussionist with the Los Angeles Philharmonic Orchestra
 John Pohl (born 1979), NHL player
 Trapper Schoepp (born 1990), musician
 James Touchi-Peters (born 1956), symphonic conductor, composer and jazz singer
 Theodore Swanson (1873–1959), farmer, Wisconsin legislator
 Charles Carroll Webster (1824-1893), lawyer and Minnesota state senator
 August Weenaas (1835–1924), founding president of Augsburg University
 Jacqueline West (born 1979), poet and author of The Books of Elsewhere
 Phyllis Yes (born 1941), feminist artist

Sister cities

  Ikata, Japan
  Quzhou, China
  Kongsberg, Norway

See also
 Red Wing Collectors Society
 Red Wing High School

References

Further reading
 Sky Crashers: A History of the Aurora Ski Club (Goodhue County Historical Society:  2004)
 Red Wing Reflections of a River Town (Red Wing Republican Eagle: 2007)

External links

 
 Red Wing Visitors and Convention Bureau – Visitor Information
 Red Wing Chamber of Commerce

 
Cities in Goodhue County, Minnesota
Cities in Minnesota
Minnesota populated places on the Mississippi River
County seats in Minnesota